Arnold Lee Dellon (born April 18, 1944) is an American plastic surgeon known for pioneering and developing the modern field of peripheral nerve injury. He is a Professor of Plastic Surgery and Neurosurgery at Johns Hopkins University and the founder of Dellon Institutes for Peripheral Nerve Surgery.

Early life and education
A. Lee Dellon was born in the Bronx, New York, to Irene Jewel Dellon and Alfred Dellon. He grew up in Saddle Brook, New Jersey and graduated from Saddle Brook High School. He went on to study pre-med at Johns Hopkins University in Baltimore and graduated with a BA in 1966. He then proceeded to  Johns Hopkins University School of Medicine where he earned his MD in 1970.

Lee then spent two years as a Clinical Associate and Lt. Commander in the United States Public Health Service in the Surgery Branch of the National Cancer Institute. He became the first Hand Surgery Fellow at the Curtis National Hand Center in Baltimore In 1977 and completed Plastic Surgery Residency at the Johns Hopkins Hospital in 1978. He received a PhD from Utrecht University in the Netherlands in 2007 for his work relieving pain, preventing ulcers and amputations in diabetics with neuropathy and chronic nerve compression.

Career
A. Lee Dellon founded the Dellon Institutes for Peripheral Nerve Surgery in 2000 and began the first Peripheral Nerve Fellowship training program in 2002. He serves as Professor of Plastic Surgery and Neurosurgery at Johns Hopkins University School of Medicine. He remains the only person to be promoted at the Johns Hopkins University to Full Professor of Plastic Surgery and Neurosurgery while in private practice.

Lee is the author of five books. Lee also wrote over 450 scientific papers. He held He held editorial positions for many years on various journals in the field of plastic surgery including Annals of Plastic Surgery, Journal of Hand Therapy, Journal of Hand Surgery, (American Volume) and Journal of Reconstructive Microsurgery.

Lee is one of the founding members of the American Society for Peripheral Nerve (ASPN) in 1991. He is the 2nd President of the ASPN. He is  also the founding member of the Association of Extremity Nerve Surgeons in 2005, and received its Lifetime Achievement Award in 2013.

Awards and recognition
 1977 -  Cleft Palate Associate Educational Award
 1985 - Robert H. Ivy Award of Pennsylvania Society of Plastic Surgeons
 1985, 2012 - Emanuel Kaplan Award of the New York State Society for Surgery of the Hand
 2005 - USA Plastic Surgeon of the Year
 2013  - Lifetime Achievement Award by Association of Extremity Nerve Surgeons

See also
 Peripheral nerve injury
 Plastic surgery
 Neurosurgery

References

External links
 

Living people
1944 births
American plastic surgeons
Johns Hopkins University faculty
People from the Bronx
People from Saddle Brook, New Jersey
Johns Hopkins University alumni
Johns Hopkins School of Medicine alumni